Raúl Alonso (born 9 January 1979) is a Spanish handball coach for HC Erlangen.

References

1979 births
Living people
Sportspeople from Madrid
Spanish male handball players
Expatriate handball players
Spanish expatriate sportspeople in Germany
BM Valladolid players
Spanish handball coaches
Handball players from the Community of Madrid
Spanish expatriate sportspeople in Belarus
Spanish expatriate sportspeople in Austria